Miguel Ángel Mayé Ngomo (born 8 December 1995), simply known as Miguel Ángel, is an Equatoguinean footballer who plays as a right back for Liga Nacional club Futuro Kings FC, where he serves as captain, and the Equatorial Guinea national team.

Club career
Born in Ebibeyin, Kié-Ntem, Miguel Ángel played with his hometown club Akonangui the preliminary round of 2014 CAF Champions League, against Cameroonian side Les Astres.

International career
On 8 January 2015, Miguel Ángel was included in Esteban Becker's 23-men list for the 2015 Africa Cup of Nations.

Statistics

International

References

External links

1995 births
Living people
People from Ebibeyin
Equatoguinean footballers
Association football fullbacks
Association football midfielders
Deportivo Mongomo players
Akonangui FC players
Leones Vegetarianos FC players
Extremadura UD footballers
Futuro Kings FC players
Tercera División players
Equatorial Guinea international footballers
2015 Africa Cup of Nations players
Equatoguinean expatriate footballers
Equatoguinean expatriate sportspeople in Spain
Expatriate footballers in Spain
Equatorial Guinea A' international footballers
2018 African Nations Championship players